Miguel Ángel Pecoraro (born in Buenos Aires, Argentina) is a former Argentine footballer who played for clubs in Argentina and Chile.

During his years in Argentina, he scored fourteen goals from penalty kicks which is the second best result for an Atlanta professional footballer.

Teams
  Atlanta 1969-1974
  Palestino 1975-1976
  Santiago Morning 1977
  Audax Italiano 1978-1980

References

External links
 

Living people
Argentine footballers
Argentine expatriate footballers
Club Atlético Atlanta footballers
Club Deportivo Palestino footballers
Audax Italiano footballers
Santiago Morning footballers
Chilean Primera División players
Argentine Primera División players
Expatriate footballers in Chile
Association football defenders
Year of birth missing (living people)
Footballers from Buenos Aires